The Junior World Series was a postseason championship series between champions of two of the three highest minor league baseball leagues modeled on the World Series of Major League Baseball. It was called the Little World Series (no relation to the Little League World Series) until 1932, and acquired other official names at different times.

The various iterations of the Junior World Series were played for most of the years of the 20th century, off and on depending on the fortunes of the various leagues involved. Most often it was held between the champions of the International League (IL) and the American Association (AA). This left the third, and sometimes stronger, minor circuit called the Pacific Coast League (PCL) out of this minor league championship series. After not being held in 1972 and 1974, the last Junior World Series was held in 1975.

The Junior World Series was superseded by the Triple-A Classic, held from 1988 to 1991. Then, from 1998 to 2000, the Triple-A World Series pitted the IL and PCL champs (as the AA had folded in 1997). The Triple-A Baseball National Championship Game was established in 2006.

Little World Series

Junior World Series

Records
In Game 2 of the 1956 Junior World Series, Roger Maris set a record with seven runs batted in.

Notes

References
Specific

General

External links
Interleague Post-season Play at the official website of the International League

Minor league baseball playoffs and champions
International League
American Association (1902–1997)
Pacific Coast League
Recurring sporting events disestablished in 1976